Anatrachyntis tripola is a moth in the family Cosmopterigidae. It was described by Edward Meyrick in 1909, and is known from South Africa.

References

Endemic moths of South Africa
Moths described in 1909
Anatrachyntis
Moths of Africa